Maguette Diongue (born 3 April 1992) is a French professional footballer who plays as a midfielder for Ligue 2 club SC Bastia.

Personal life 
Born in France, Diongue is of Senegalese descent. His father Yoro came to France from Senegal to play for Cherbourg in the 1980s. The Diongue family lived in Octeville, and Maguette started playing football at the local club of Patronage Laïque d'Octeville.

Honours 
Bastia
 Championnat National: 2020–21

References

External links 
 SC Bastia profile
 

1992 births
Living people
People from Cherbourg-Octeville
Sportspeople from Manche
French sportspeople of Senegalese descent
French footballers
Footballers from Normandy
Association football midfielders
Ligue 2 players
Championnat National players
Championnat National 2 players
AS Cherbourg Football players
US Avranches players
CA Bastia players
Athlético Marseille players
JA Drancy players
SC Bastia players